Big Branch is a  long 2nd order tributary to the Haw River, in Alamance County, North Carolina.

Course
Big Branch rises west-northwest of Mandale in Alamance County, North Carolina and then flows east to the Haw River about 1.5 miles northeast of Mandale.

Watershed
Big Branch drains  of area, receives about 47.1 in/year of precipitation, and has a wetness index of 426.73 and is about 47% forested.

See also
List of rivers of North Carolina

References

Rivers of North Carolina
Rivers of Alamance County, North Carolina